Voronovskoye Settlement is a settlement (both municipal and administrative unit in Moscow) in Troitsky Administrative Okrug of Moscow. It was established in 2005 as Voronovskoye urban settlement in Podolsky municipal raion of Moscow Oblast and now it consists of the settlement of LMS and 22 other inhabited localities of the abolished Voronovskoye rural district. On 1 July 2012, Voronovskoye Settlement was transferred to the city of Moscow and became a part of Troitsky Administrative Okrug.

References

External links

 Website of administration of Voronovskoye Settlement

 
Troitsky Administrative Okrug
Settlements of Moscow